Citrobacter murliniae is a species of bacteria.

References

Further reading

External links

LPSN
Type strain of Citrobacter murliniae at BacDive -  the Bacterial Diversity Metadatabase

murliniae
Bacteria described in 1999